The Rochers de Gagnerie (2,735 m) are a mountain of the Chablais Alps, overlooking the Lac de Salanfe in the canton of Valais. They lie in the massif of the Dents du Midi, forming a huge wall at the end of the Saint Barthélemy valley, south-west of Mex.

The mountain includes several secondary summits, among which the sharp needle of La Vierge (2,641 m).

References

External links
 Rochers de Gagnerie on Hikr

Mountains of the Alps
Mountains of Valais
Mountains of Switzerland
Two-thousanders of Switzerland